The 2019–20 Cymru Premier (known as JD Cymru Premier for sponsorship reasons) was the 28th season of the Cymru Premier (formally known as The Welsh Premier League), the highest football league within Wales since its establishment in 1992. Thirteenth-time champions, The New Saints were the defending champions, having won their eighth consecutive title in 2019. The season commenced on 16 August 2019 and concluded in March 2020, a few weeks earlier than the scheduled end date of 25 April 2020. Teams played each other twice on a home and away basis, before the league split into two groups after phase 1 matches were completed on 17 January 2020 – the top six and the bottom six.

Effects of the 2019–20 coronavirus pandemic 
On 13 March 2020, all games were suspended due to the COVID-19 pandemic.  On 19 May 2020, the league was cancelled.  Connah's Quay Nomads F.C. were declared the champions, for the first time in their history.  They were given the league's bid to the 2020–21 UEFA Champions League.  The New Saints and Bala Town finished 2nd and 3rd respectively, earning the league's two places in the 2020–21 UEFA Europa League first qualifying round. 

The 2019–20 Welsh Cup was postponed and could not be completed by the UEFA deadline of entering European qualification.  Therefore the 4th placed finished team, Barry Town, earned the preliminary round spot that would have normally gone to the winners of the European play-offs which would now not take place. The bottom two teams at the date of suspension were relegated.

Teams

Twelve teams competed in the league – the top ten teams from the previous season, and one team each promoted from the Cymru North and Cymru South.

The two bottom placed teams from the 2018-2019 season, Llandudno, and Llanelli Town, were relegated to Cymru North and Cymru South, respectively, for the 2019–20 season.

Airbus UK Broughton, champions of the now defunct Cymru Alliance and Penybont, champions of the Welsh Football League Division One were promoted to the Cymru Premier. Airbus UK Broughton returned to the Cymru Premier after two years in the now defunct Cymru Alliance, while Bridgend-based Penybont were making their first appearance in the Cymru Premier having only been formed in 2013. By replacing Llanelli Town, the South Wales based clubs remained at four.

Stadia and locations

Personnel and kits

League table

Results
Teams played each other twice on a home and away basis, before the league split into two groups – the top six and the bottom six.

Matches 1–22

Season statistics

Scoring

Top scorers

References

External links

League rules 

Cymru Premier seasons
2019–20 in Welsh football
Wales
Wales